Baburam Dhakal (born 4 April 1979) is a film director active in the Nepali film industry. He has directed several successful Nepali movies, such as Dulahi, 9 O’clock and Parkhi Rakha Hai. Dhakal is also a screenwriter and a producer.

Dhakal has been involved in the film industry since 2000, when he was an assistant director for the TV series Rista, broadcast on Zee TV in India. The first TV series he directed was Nalekhiyeko Saino in 2005, broadcast on Kantipur Television Network. The first Nepali feature film he directed was Parkhi Rakha Hai in 2009, produced by Diya Films Pvt. Ltd. In 2015, he produced and directed the upcoming Nepali feature film Teen Ghumti.

Career

Television series

Filmography

Awards
Baburam Dhakal has achieved the following awards:

 CG Digital D Cine awards, Best Director
 Box Office Film Awards
 Nefta Film Award

References

1979 births
Living people
Place of birth missing (living people)
Nepalese film directors
21st-century Nepalese screenwriters
20th-century Nepalese screenwriters
21st-century Nepalese film directors